Blue Slide Park is the debut studio album by American rapper Mac Miller. It was released on November 8, 2011, by Rostrum Records. The album is named after a section of Frick Park (known as "Blue Slide Park") in Pittsburgh, near where Miller lived. Much of the production was handled by ID Labs, and the album has no guest appearances.

Despite Blue Slide Park receiving mixed reviews from critics, it debuted at number one on the US Billboard 200 with 144,000 sales, making it the first independently-distributed debut album to top the chart since 1995.

Background and release
On July 5, 2011, Mac Miller announced Blue Slide Park on his YouTube channel. The tracks "Smile Back" and "Blue Slide Park" were released as non-singles on September 23 and October 13, respectively. The latter track was released to commemorate the album surpassing 25,000 pre-orders. The album cover art was designed by his older brother, Miller McCormick. Blue Slide Park was released by Rostrum Records on November 8, 2011.

Singles 
The album's first single, "Frick Park Market", was produced by ID Labs, and released alongside an accompanying music video on August 18, 2011. The song peaked at number 60 on the US Billboard Hot 100 chart. At the time, it was Miller's highest charting single, surpassing "Donald Trump", which charted at number 75.

The second single, "Party on Fifth Ave.", also produced by ID Labs, was released on October 28, 2011, with an accompanying music video. The song debuted at number 64 on the Billboard Hot 100.

"Up All Night" was released as the third single digitally via iTunes on November 15, 2011. The song peaked at number 23 on the Billboard Bubbling Under Hot 100 chart.

Critical reception

Blue Slide Park received generally mixed reviews from music critics. At Metacritic, a site that calculates an aggregate score based on a number of professional reviews, the album has received a score of 58/100 (based on 12 articles) which indicates "mixed or average reviews". Jon Garcia of AllHipHop.com gave the album a rating of 6.5 out of 10, criticising the production and claiming that "it's as if he hasn't found his sound yet". XXL viewed the album's production more positively, but noted that Miller still has "room to evolve". Jordan Sargent of Pitchfork gave the album a 1.0 out of 10 rating, and wrote "Miller's world is a hermetic one, and unless it's one you inhabit, the album holds no appeal", and "he's mostly just a crushingly bland, more intolerable version of Wiz Khalifa".

Commercial performance 
Blue Slide Park debuted at number one on the US Billboard 200 chart, selling 144,000 copies in its first week, making it the first independently-distributed debut album to top the chart since Tha Dogg Pound's Dogg Food (1995). In its second week, the album fell to number 24 with 25,000 sales, one of the largest drops from number one at the time. Despite not being released as a single, the track "Smile Back" became Miller's highest-charting song at the time, reaching number 55 on the Billboard Hot 100 chart dated November 26, 2011. As of August 2012, the album has sold 344,000 copies.

On May 14, 2018, the album was certified gold by the Recording Industry Association of America (RIAA) for combined sales and streams in excess of 500,000 units in the United States. Blue Slide Park earned 12,000 album-equivalent units in the week following Miller's death on September 7, 2018, allowing the album to re-enter the Billboard 200 at number 49.

In Canada, the album debuted at number eight on the Canadian Albums Chart. On December 18, 2012, the album was certified gold by Music Canada (MC) for shipments exceeding 40,000 units in Canada.

Track listing
Credits adapted from Tidal.

Tour

Europe – The Incredibly Dope Tour
Miller toured Europe in early September 2011 to promote the album. The United Kingdom leg of The Incredibly Dope Tour ran from September 1 to 4, making up four dates in London, Manchester, Birmingham, and Glasgow. The tour also extended to mainland Europe, beginning in Amsterdam on September 6. Two dates in Paris were also announced, as well as Opwijk before Mac's return to the United States to perform at the 2011 edition of Rock the Bells in Boston. Later dates also saw Miller performing in Germany, and Scandinavia.
He also performed at The National and other famous venues.

United States – Blue Slide Park Tour
Miller's tour of the United States ran from September to December 2011. The Blue Slide Park Tour began on September 22, 2011, at the Irving Plaza in Manhattan, New York City. The final date was on December 9, with Miller performing in his hometown of Pittsburgh.

Charts

Weekly charts

Year-end charts

Certifications

References 

Mac Miller albums
2011 debut albums
Rostrum Records albums
Albums produced by Mac Miller